Lozac'h or Lozach is a surname, and may refer to;

Lozac'h derives from ozac'h which means head of household in Breton. (cf. Ozhac'h)

 Jean Lozach - French actor featured in The Damned (1947 film)
 Pierre Lozach - French writer and actor featured in Le Boulanger de Valorgue
 Gurvan Lozac'h - French audio collector and archivist of Breton native speakers and author of Diksionêr kreis-Breizh dictionary of local Breton spoken in the region between the Monts d'Arrée and the Montagnes Noires
 SonaOne (born Mikael Lozac’h on November 30, 1988) - French-Malaysian rapper
 Véronique Salze-Lozac'h - French economist and lecturer working for The Asia Foundation
 Jean-Jacques Lozach - French politician
 Alain Lozac’h - French writer
Pierre-Yves Lozach - virologist
Jean-Yves Lozac'h - French pedal steel guitar player
Jean-Marc Lozach - New York City Executive Chef

References

External links
Distribution of the surname Lozach in France

Breton-language surnames